Aras Aydın (born 4 January 1989) is a Turkish actor.

Aydın was born in 1989 in Eskişehir. He studied theatre at the Istanbul University State Conservatory. He made his debut in 2010 with the series Öğretmen Kemal. In 2013, he briefly appeared in the series Şefkat Tepe and in 2014 he was cast in a supporting role in Saklı Kalan. He was first noted by the general audience with his portrayal of Emre Yiğit in Kiraz Mevsimi. He then made his cinematic debut in 2016 with a leading role in the movie Oğlan Bizim Kız Bizim. Aydın later had main roles in series such as Altınsoylar and Canevim.

Filmography

References

External links 
 
 

1989 births
Living people
Turkish male television actors
Turkish male film actors
People from Eskişehir